Mu Beta Phi Military Fraternity, Inc. also known as the "Mighty Beta Kings", is an international military fraternity that caters to all 50 states and overseas in Southeast Asia and Europe.  The motivation to serve, support and defend the men and women in the local and veteran communities amplified the passion to give back and provide an outlet for men of the Armed Services of all nationalities, continued service within the community, leading to the establishment of Mu Beta Phi Military Fraternity Inc.

History
Mu Beta Phi Military Fraternity, Inc. was founded March 22, 2017, and officially incorporated April 17, 2017, by three active duty and retired military men, across three branches of service. Built off the principle of mission, brotherhood, and professionalism, the brothers of Mu Beta Phi, have taken a sworn oath to strengthen the veteran community, restore faith in the community, and broaden knowledge to our veterans.

Hercules PHIrst Warriors
Hercules PHIrst Warriors, were the Alpha Line members of Mu Beta Phi consisting of Efferen Hernandez, Leander Holston Jr., Antonio Brown, Jason Williams, Marquette Jones, Timothy Hall, Lugene Johnson, Jeremiah Thompson, Murad Dixon, Shawn Ollison.

Founders
The Mu Beta Phi founders are: Dr. Gary V. Ammons (Navy), Darrin Coney (Air Force), and Clifton Powell (Army).

Affiliations
Mu Beta Phi is a member of the Professional Fraternity Association (PFA), in the category of military science, the Association of Fraternity/Sorority Advisors (AFA), the Armed Forces Chamber of Commerce (AFCOC) and the Fraternity Communications Association (FCA).

International Presidents (2017-present)
Jason Williams (2021-Present)
Jason Williams (Interim) (2019-2021)
Darrin Coney (2017-2019)

Courts

Royal Courts (Chapters)
RC-Α: Hampton Roads, VA
RC-Γ: Philadelphia
RC-Δ: Columbia, South Carolina
RC-Ε: Illinois
RC-Ζ: Washington, D.C.
RC-Η: Jacksonville, Florida
RC-Θ: Atlanta, Georgia
RC-Κ: Dallas, Texas
RC-Λ: San Diego, California
RC-Ν: New York City, New York
RC-Ξ: Las Vegas, Nevada
RC-ΑΦ:Norfolk State University

Court (Chartering)
Crt-Ι:Memphis, Tennessee
Crt-Μ:Charlotte, North Carolina
Crt-O:Gulfport, Mississippi
Crt-Π:Houston, Texas
Crt-Ρ:Chicago, Illinois

INTERNATIONAL COURTS
Int-ΑΓ:Bahrain
Int-ΑΔ:Germany
Int-ΑΕ:Spain
Int-ΑΖ:Japan

Proclamations and recognition
The Mayor of Columbia, South Carolina, Stephen K. Benjamin proclaimed March 2, 2019, as South Carolina Chapter of Mu Beta Phi Military Fraternity, Inc. Day.

Mu Beta Phi Military Fraternity, Inc. was recognized as the 2021 Outstanding Community Service Award recipient by the Professional Fraternity Association for their dedication to the local and veteran community.

Mu Beta Phi Military Fraternity, Inc.'s Founder and visionary; Dr. Gary V. Ammons was the recipient of the 2021 Outstanding Community Leader award by the Professional Fraternity Association, for his leadership and inspiration to the community.

Mu Beta Phi has also been recognized through formal citation and official lettering from senator and member of the Senate Armed Services Committee, Tim Kaine of Virginia, for their work within veteran community, their work with the homeless veteran population and advocates for veteran benefits and veteran mental health care.

Mu Beta Phi has been recognized by senator and member of the Congressional Black Caucus (CBC), Jim Clyburn of South Carolina for their dedication and work for minority military men and their equal rights of recognition within the military ranks and their advocacy work within the communities they serve.

Mu Beta Phi has received numerous state and government level proclamations, letters of commendation, and letters of appreciation from the Senate Armed Services Committee, Governor Tim Kaine of Virginia, Senator James Clyburn of South Carolina, Senators Stephanie Murphy of Florida, Mayor William Sessoms of Virginia Beach, Mayor Linda Johnson of Suffolk, Virginia, Mayor Carolyn Goodman of Las Vegas, Nevada; recognizing their work for the local communities and veteran families in which they live.

Partnerships
Big Brothers Big Sisters of America
Boy Scouts of America
Norfolk State University RC-ΑΦ 
Marshall Early Learning Center, Hampton, VA
West Philadelphia Achievement Charter Elementary School (WPACES), Philadelphia, PA

See also
Professional fraternities and sororities
Service fraternities and sororities

References

External links 

2017 establishments in South Carolina
Student organizations established in 2017
Professional military fraternities and sororities in the United States
Professional Fraternity Association